Vargem Alta is a municipality located in the Brazilian state of Espírito Santo. Its population was 21,591 (2020) and its area is 415 km².

The municipality contains part of the protected area of the Frade e a Freira Natural Monument.

References

Municipalities in Espírito Santo